The Zone was a sci-fi, fantasy, horror and cult television channel on New Zealand's Sky Television on Channel 9.

The channel was announced in July 2014, and began to broadcast in November 2014. It was added at no additional cost to the basic subscription package.

The channel closed on 30 June 2017. It was replaced on Sky by a new channel, Sky Box Sets.

Sources

Defunct television channels in New Zealand
Television channels and stations established in 2013
English-language television stations in New Zealand
2013 establishments in New Zealand
Television channels and stations disestablished in 2017
2017 disestablishments in New Zealand